Krishnapura Madaiah Mahadevaswamy, known as Malavalli Mahadevaswamy, is an Indian folk Kannada singer. He is known for his folk and devotional songs on Manteswamy, Siddappaji and Male Mahadeshwara. He is honoured with the Rajyotsava Prashasti by the Karnataka Government and an Honourary Doctorate from Mysore University.

Early life
Mahadevaswamy was born in a Dalit family in Krishpura village, Malavalli Taluk. His parents were Shehnai Madaiah and Sobane Manchamma. He studied at SSLC.

Career
Mahadevaswamy started singing on Manteswamy, Siddappaji and Male Maadappa which became popular. He belongs to the Neelagara tradition. The most popular is "Maadeshwara Daya Baarade". Later on he songs on Male Maadappa with S. Janaki, Vani Jairam, Sangeetha Katti, S. P. Balasubrahmanyam, Manjula Gururaj and others. 

He acted in the titular role in a film called Siddappajiya Pavadagalu  which became popular for its songs.

To date, Mahadevaswamy has recorded more than 1000 songs. He has been singing for 40 years and performing all over the state and  abroad.

Recognition
 Rajyotsava Prashasti, second highest civilian award in Karnataka by the Karnataka Government
 Honorary Doctorate from Mysore University

Songs
Devotional songs
 Maadeshwara Daya Baarade
 Yaarige Olideya
 Baduki Uliyuvene
 Navilondu Naliyutide
 Baa Nanna Maadeva 
 Hogalaare Halagurige 

Folk songs
 O Nanna Chinnave O Nanna Rannave
 Maduvege Baare Thangyamma
 Yalakki Kaayi Tindu
 Bhagyada Balegara

References

1959 births
Playback singers
Living people
Indian singers
Indian actors
Kannada people
 People from Mandya
 Musicians from Karnataka
Folk singers
 Indian folk singers
Indian playback singers